RNIE 7 is a national highway of Benin.

References

Roads in Benin